Grajenščak is a settlement in the Municipality of Ptuj in northeastern Slovenia. It lies on the edge of the Slovene Hills, north of Ptuj. The area is part of the traditional region of Styria. It is now included with the rest of the municipality in the Drava Statistical Region.

References

External links

Grajenščak at Geopedia

Populated places in the City Municipality of Ptuj